PalaFermi is an indoor sporting arena located in Pistoia, Italy.  The capacity of the arena is 4000 people and it was built in 1988.  It is currently home to the Pistoia Basket 2000 basketball team.

Indoor arenas in Italy
Basketball venues in Italy